Jai Krishna Mandal is an Indian politician from Bihar who represented Purnia in the Lok Sabha from 1998 to 1999. However he lost the subsequent election to Pappu Yadav.

References 

India MPs 1998–1999
Bharatiya Janata Party politicians from Bihar
1950 births
Lok Sabha members from Bihar
Living people